Jacoby Church and Cemetery is a historic community church and cemetery located in Center Township, Marshall County, Indiana.  The church was built in 1860, and is a one-story, Greek Revival style frame building, measuring 32 feet by 40 feet.  The front facade features a projecting bell tower / vestibule added in 1910.  The cemetery was established in 1850, and contains approximately 166 burials.

It was listed in the National Register of Historic Places in 2007.

References

Churches on the National Register of Historic Places in Indiana
Greek Revival church buildings in Indiana
1850 establishments in Indiana
Churches completed in 1860
Buildings and structures in Marshall County, Indiana
National Register of Historic Places in Marshall County, Indiana